A Drop of Water is the debut album by Keiko Matsui that was released in 1987 by Passport.

Track listing

Personnel 
 Keiko Matsui – piano, shakuhachi, synthesizer
 Kazu Matsui – shakuhachi
 David Garfield – piano, synthesizer
 Derek Nakamoto – synthesizer
 Walt Fowler – flugelhorn
 Brandon Fields – saxophone
 Robben Ford – guitar
 Grant Geissman – guitar
 Suzie Katayama – cello
 Matt Bissonette – bass guitar
 Nathan East – bass guitar, vocals
 Jimmy Johnson – bass guitar
 John Leftwich – bass guitar
 Gregg Bissonette – drums
 Vinnie Colaiuta – drums
 Bernie Dresel – drums
 Luis Conte – percussion
 Michael Fisher – percussion
 Carl Anderson – vocals, background vocals
 Maxi Anderson – vocals
 Marlena Jeter – vocals
 Marva King – vocals
 Molly Pasutti – vocals

References

1987 debut albums
Keiko Matsui albums